Victor Brandt (born September 19, 1942) is an American actor.

Brandt was born in Los Angeles, California. He has appeared as an actor in several classic shows such as Star Trek: The Original Series, Mission Impossible and T. J. Hooker. He has provided voices for various shows, including the roles of Emil Hamilton in Superman: The Animated Series, Master Pakku in Avatar: The Last Airbender, Rupert Thorne in The Batman animated series, and General Crozier in Metalocalypse.

Filmography

Film

Television

Video games

References

External links 
 

1942 births
Living people
American male television actors
American male voice actors
Male actors from Los Angeles
20th-century American male actors
21st-century American male actors